MLT may refer to:

People
 MLT (hacktivist)

Computing and technology
 Dimensional Analysis as in MLT (mass, length, time), without regard to specific measurement units
 Mean Length Turn in wound electrical components
 Mechanized loop testing, in the Loop maintenance operations system
 Media Lovin' Toolkit, a multimedia framework for television broadcasting
 Metropolis light transport, a modified Monte Carlo method
 Modulated Lapped Transform, a type of modified discrete cosine transform (MDCT) used in speech coding standards such as G.722.1
 Multi-level transmit as in MLT-3 encoding, a serial line code
 Multi-link trunking in networking

Transportation
 Malta, by country code
 Malton railway station, England, National Rail station code
 Millinocket Municipal Airport, IATA code
 Mountain Line Transit Authority, American bus system in West Virginia

Other uses
 Master of Laws in Taxation, a college degree
 Medical Laboratory Technician, an occupation in a US clinical laboratory
 MALT1 or MLT, a protein
 Maquis La Tourette, French resistance fighters during World War II
 Milton Corporation, Australian investment company Australian Securities Exchange code
 Mobile Language Team, University of Adelaide
 Modern Literal Taiwanese, an orthography